Mindanao State University – Tawi-tawi College of Technology and Oceanography or (MSU-TCTO) is an autonomous campus of the Mindanao State University system located in Sanga-Sanga, Bongao, in the province of Tawi-Tawi, Philippines.

History
On March 16, 1982, Batas Pambansa Blg. 197 was signed into law, changing the name of Sulu College of Technology and Oceanography into Tawi-Tawi College of Technology and Oceanography. It became part of the Mindanao State University System as an autonomous campus.

References

Mindanao State University
Universities and colleges in Tawi-Tawi